The Bela-Bela Local Municipality is a Local Municipality in Limpopo, South Africa. The council consists of seventeen members elected by mixed-member proportional representation. Nine councillors are elected by first-past-the-post voting in nine wards, while the remaining eight are chosen from party lists so that the total number of party representatives is proportional to the number of votes received. In the election of 1 November 2021 the African National Congress (ANC) won a majority of ten seats.

Results 
The following table shows the composition of the council after past elections.

March 2006 election

The following table shows the results of the 2006 election.

May 2011 election

The following table shows the results of the 2011 election.

August 2016 election

The following table shows the results of the 2016 election.

By-elections from August 2016 to November 2021
The following by-elections were held to fill vacant ward seats in the period from the election in November 2021.

In a by-election held on 17 July 2018, a ward previously held by a DA councillor was won by an ANC candidate. Council composition was reconfigured as seen below:

November 2021 election

The following table shows the results of the 2021 election.

By-elections from November 2021
The following by-elections were held to fill vacant ward seats in the period from the election in November 2021.

In ward 7, a by-election was held after the previous DA councillor resigned. The DA's support dropped from 60% in 2021 to 34%, with the Freedom Front Plus taking the ward, increasing their share from 28% to 57%

References

Bela-Bela
Elections in Limpopo
Waterberg District Municipality